The Embassy of Nepal in Washington, D.C. is the Federal Democratic Republic of Nepal's diplomatic mission to the United States. It is located at 2730 34th Place NW Washington, D.C., in the Glover Park neighborhood. The Ambassador is Sridhar Khatri.

References

External links

Official website
wikimapia

Nepal
Washington, D.C.
Nepal–United States relations